Madonna King is an Australian journalist, author and media commentator.

From 2006 until 2011, King presented Mornings on ABC Radio Brisbane.

As an author, King has published several books, including the biographies of notable Australians Ian Frazer, Joe Hockey and Maxine Horne. She has also co-authored a book about the Bali Nine.

In 2018, Queensland premier Annastacia Palaszczuk appointed King as chairwoman of the Queensland Government's fledgling anti-bullying taskforce, established in the wake of the suicide of teenage cyberbullying victim Amy "Dolly" Everett.

Works 
In addition to biographies, King has written a series of books for young adults:

References 

Year of birth missing (living people)
Living people
Australian journalists
Australian women journalists
Australian radio presenters
Australian women radio presenters